The Cod. Pal. germ. 359 (CPG 359) is an illustrated manuscript created in Strasbourg ca. 1418. It contains the texts Rosengarten zu Worms and Lucidarius.

External links
facsimile

1410s books
German poetry collections
Literary illuminated manuscripts
Medieval literature